A Roman column stands in Minster Yard in the English city of York. Originally built around the first century, by the soldiers of Legio IX Hispana, it was reused by Legion VI in the 4th century. It is believed to have been part of a group of sixteen freestanding columns (eight on each side of the nave), supporting the walls of an earlier church on the site.

The column was discovered beneath York Minster during a 1969 excavation, and was given to the City of York three years later to mark the 1900th anniversary of the city's founding.

It now stands in front of the Minster School, in Minster Yard, on the southern side of York Minster.

References

Minster Yard
Buildings and structures completed in the 1st century
Buildings and structures in York
Limestone buildings in the United Kingdom
Roman sites in North Yorkshire